Parviturbo acuticostatus is a species of minute sea snail, a marine gastropod mollusk in the family Skeneidae.

Description
The maximum diameter of the shell can reach 3 mm.

Distribution
This species occurs in the Pacific Ocean off California.

References

External links
 To USNM Invertebrate Zoology Mollusca Collection
 To USNM Invertebrate Zoology Mollusca Collection
 To World Register of Marine Species

acuticostatus
Gastropods described in 1864